On 15 May 2016, a team of ISIL bombers assaulted a natural-gas plant north of Baghdad, Iraq, killing at least 14 people, eight suicide bombers, injuring 27 troops and burning 20 workers.

Attack
A government-run plant was attacked, with attacks starting at dawn, with a suicide car bomber hitting the facility's main gate in the town of Taji, about 20km north of Baghdad. After eight suicide bombings, clashes broke out with security forces, leaving 27 soldiers wounded. Around 20 workers of the plant were seriously burned. ISIL suspected, that the plant was being used by the Iraqi army. Three of the facility's gas storages were set alight, before security forces were able to bring the situation under control. Firefighters managed to control and extinguish a fire, caused by the explosions, and technicians examined the damage. The power station provided, with the help of others, that had halted operations, 153 megawatts to the already overstretched national grid before the attack. Eight policemen were among the casualties of the attack.

References

2016 murders in Iraq
Suicide bombings in 2016
21st-century mass murder in Iraq
2010s in Baghdad
Car and truck bombings in Iraq
ISIL terrorist incidents in Iraq
Mass murder in 2016
Mass murder in Iraq
Suicide bombings in Iraq
Terrorist incidents in Iraq in 2016
Islamic terrorist incidents in 2016
May 2016 crimes in Asia
May 2016 events in Iraq